Francis L. Donovan is a United States Marine Corps lieutenant general who serves as the vice commander of the United States Special Operations Command. He has served as the commanding general of the 2nd Marine Division from 2020 to 2022.

As a LtCol, Donovan served as Executive Officer of Marine Corps Special Operations Command Detachment One (Det One) from 16 April 2005 to 10 March 2006. He later served as the Assistant Commanding General, Joint Special Operations Command (JSOC). Prior to JSOC, Major General Donovan spent two years as the Commanding General of Naval Amphibious Forces, Task Force 51 / 5th Marine Expeditionary Brigade - known as Task Force 51/5.  

Donovan earned a B.A. degree in geography from Towson University. He later received a Master of Military Studies degree from the Marine Corps Command and Staff College and a Master of Strategic Studies degree the U.S. Army War College.

After division command, he served as the director of Marine Corps Communication.

In September 2022, Donovan was nominated for promotion to lieutenant general with assignment as vice commander, U.S. Special Operations Command. He was confirmed December 15, 2022.

Awards and decorations

References

External links

Year of birth missing (living people)
Living people
Place of birth missing (living people)
Towson University alumni
Recipients of the Silver Star
Marine Corps University alumni
United States Army War College alumni
Recipients of the Meritorious Service Medal (United States)
Recipients of the Legion of Merit
United States Marine Corps generals
Recipients of the Defense Superior Service Medal